The 1999–2000 Ice Hockey Superleague season was the fourth season of the Sekonda Ice Hockey Superleague (ISL).

There were no changes in the teams from the 1998–99 season. However the league introduced a wage cap of £500,000 for this season.

Benson & Hedges Cup
The 1999 Benson & Hedges Cup consisted of the teams from the ISL and the teams from the British National League (BNL). The BNL teams were split into three groups of four teams (groups A, B and C) and the ISL teams were split into two groups of four teams (groups D and E). Each team played the other teams in the group once at home and away.

The group winners from the BNL groups and the best runner-up entered the knock-out stage in a preliminary challenge round qualifier with the winners progressing to the challenge round to meet the fourth placed teams from the ISL group stage. The winners of the challenge rounds entered the quarter finals with the top three teams from each ISL group.

All games after the group stages were home and away aggregate scores except for the challenge round and the final itself which were one-off games. The final was held at Sheffield Arena.

First round

Group A

Group B

Group C

Group D

Group E

Second round

Challenge round qualifiers
Peterborough Pirates vs Fife Flyers
Peterborough Pirates 2–1 Fife Flyers
Fife Flyers 3–4 Peterborough Pirates (Peterborough win 6–4 on aggregate)

Basingstoke Bison vs Hull Thunder
Basingstoke Bison 3–2 Hull Thunder
Hull Thunder 1–3 Basingstoke Bison (Basingstoke win 6–3 on aggregate)

Challenge round
Peterborough Pirates 3–5 Nottingham Panthers
Basingstoke Bison 1–4 Sheffield Steelers

Finals

Quarter-finals
Nottingham Panthers vs Cardiff Devils
Nottingham Panthers 1–6 Cardiff Devils
Cardiff Devils 7–1 Nottingham Panthers (Cardiff win 13–2 on aggregate)

Manchester Storm vs Sheffield Steelers
Manchester Storm 6–6 Sheffield Steelers
Sheffield Steelers 2–3 Manchester Storm (Manchester win 9–8 on aggregate)

Newcastle Riverkings vs Bracknell Bees
Newcastle Riverkings 5–8 Bracknell Bees
Bracknell Bees 7–4 Newcastle Riverkings (Bracknell win 15–9 on aggregate)

London Knights vs Ayr Scottish Eagles
London Knights 1–0 Ayr Scottish Eagles
Ayr Scottish Eagles 0–7 London Knights (London win 7–1 on aggregate)

Semi-finals
Manchester Storm vs Cardiff Devils
Manchester Storm 4–0 Cardiff Devils
Cardiff Devils 0–0 Manchester Storm (Manchester win 4–0 on aggregate)

Bracknell Bees vs London Knights
Bracknell Bees 3–5 London Knights
London Knights 5–3 Bracknell Bees (London win 10–6 on aggregate)

Final
The final took place at Sheffield Arena between Manchester Storm and London Knights.
Manchester Storm 4–3 London Knights (after overtime and penalty shootout)

Challenge Cup
All eight teams in the league competed in the Challenge Cup. The first round was the first home and away meeting of each team in the league with the points counting towards both the Challenge Cup table and the league table. The top four teams progressed to the semi finals. The semi finals were home and away games with the winner on aggregate progressing to the one off final game.

In a repeat of the previous season's Challenge Cup final, Sheffield Steelers took on the Nottingham Panthers and won the competition.

First round

Semi-finals
2nd place (Cardiff) vs 3rd place (Sheffield)
Sheffield Steelers 1–2 Bracknell Bees
Bracknell Bees 4–8 Sheffield Steelers (Sheffield win 9–6 on aggregate)

1st place (London) vs 4th place (Nottingham)
London Knights 1–4 Nottingham Panthers
Nottingham Panthers 3–3 London Knights (Nottingham win 7–4 on aggregate)

FinalWinner A vs Winner BSheffield Steelers 2–1 Nottingham Panthers

League
Each team played three home games and three away games against each of their opponents. All eight teams were entered into the playoffs.

Playoffs
All eight teams in the league took part in the playoffs. Group A consisted of Bracknell, London, Newcastle and Nottingham while Group B consisted of Ayr, Cardiff, Manchester and Sheffield. The top two teams from each playoff group qualified for the finals weekend. The third place playoff was dropped for this season.

Group A

Group B

Semi-finalsWinner B vs Runner-Up ASheffield Steelers 1-3 Newcastle RiverkingsWinner A vs Runner-Up BLondon Knights 2–1 Ayr Scottish Eagles (after overtime)

FinalWinner B vs Winner ALondon Knights 7-3 Newcastle Riverkings

Awards
Coach of the Year Trophy – Dave Whistle, Bracknell Bees
Player of the Year Trophy – Ed Courtenay, Sheffield Steelers
Ice Hockey Annual Trophy – Tony Hand, Ayr Scottish Eagles
British Netminder of the Year – Stevie Lyle, Cardiff Devils
Alan Weeks Trophy – Stephen Cooper, Nottingham Panthers

All Star teams

Scoring leaders
The scoring leaders are taken from all league games.

Most points: 70 Ed Courtenay (Sheffield Steelers)
Most goals: 32 Ed Courtenay (Sheffield Steelers)
Most assists: 39 Mikko Koivunoro (Newcastle Riverkings)
Most PIMs: 172''' Clayton Norris (Newcastle Riverkings)

References
Ice Hockey Journalists UK
The Internet Hockey Database
Malcolm Preen's Ice Hockey Results and Tables

Footnotes

Ice Hockey Superleague seasons
1
United